Caissa is a moth genus in the family Limacodidae.

Species 
Caissa aurea
Caissa bezverkhovi
Caissa caii
Caissa caissa  Hering, 1931
Caissa fasciatum
Caissa gambita
Caissa longisaccula
Caissa medialis
Caissa parenti
Caissa staurognatha

References

External links 

Limacodidae genera
Limacodidae